"Don't Turn Around" is a song recorded by Australian singer-songwriter Amy Shark. It was released on 8 June 2018 initially as a pre-order album track, and was later confirmed as the album's second single from her debut studio album Love Monster. In a statement, Shark said: "It's a song that talks about the desire to run into someone you have feelings for, a history with who knows you too well."

Reception
Madelyn Tait from The Music Au, in an album review, called the song "infectious" saying "Shark expresses a desire to run into someone she has feelings for, almost rapping with the vocal rhythms she delivers over strummed guitar during the song's bridge."
Cameron Adams from Herald Sun, in an album review said the song was "catchy mellow radio-ready pop."

Track listing
 "Don't Turn Around"  - 3:05

Charts

Release history

References
 

2018 singles
Amy Shark songs
Sony Music Australia singles
2018 songs
Songs written by Amy Shark
Song recordings produced by Dann Hume